Claudio Amarildo Gomes (born 23 July 2000) is a French professional footballer who plays as a defensive midfielder for  club Palermo.

Formed at Paris Saint-Germain, where he made one reserve team appearance in the Championnat National 2 in 2017, he joined Manchester City the following year. He played three senior games for City, winning the FA Community Shield in 2018 on his debut, and was loaned to Jong PSV and Barnsley in the Dutch and English second tiers before transferring to Palermo in 2022.

Gomes represented France from under-16 to under-20 level, earning 50 caps from 2015 to 2019.

Club career

Early career 
Born in Argenteuil, Val-d'Oise on 23 July 2000, Gomes played as a youth for ASC Val d'Argenteuil and RFC Argenteuil, two teams in his hometown, before joining Évreux in 2011 and Paris Saint-Germain two years later.

Gomes made his senior debut for PSG's reserves on 18 November 2017, his one appearance for the club. He came on as a 79th-minute substitute for Abdallah Yaisien in a 2–1 home loss to Yzeure in the Championnat National 2 (fourth tier).

Manchester City 
On 25 July 2018, Gomes signed with Manchester City. He had trained with the club since the expiry of his PSG contract in June, and been on their pre-season tour of the United States, but they were forced to wait for him to turn 18 before signing him. He made his professional debut on 5 August in a 2–0 win over Chelsea in the 2018 FA Community Shield at Wembley Stadium, coming on in added time for John Stones. He was in the game for one second before the final whistle blew and his team won the trophy.

After making one further appearance for Manchester City in the EFL Cup, Gomes joined PSV Eindhoven on loan for the 2019–20 season, joining up with the Jong PSV squad.

Gomes was back at Manchester City for the 2020–21 season. On 10 February 2021, he made his FA Cup debut as a substitute for the injured Rodri in a 3–1 away win over Championship side Swansea City.

On 31 August 2021, Gomes joined Barnsley in the EFL Championship on loan for the season. He played 32 total games, scoring once to open a 1–1 draw at Swansea City on 15 April 2022. After the Reds were relegated to EFL League One, the loans of Gomes, Domingos Quina and Amine Bassi were terminated on 26 April.

Palermo
On 1 September 2022, Gomes was signed by Italian Serie B club Palermo on a permanent two-year deal. He was the first player to join from Manchester City after Palermo had been taken over by the City Football Group. He made his debut eight days later as a late substitute for Leo Štulac in a 1–0 home win over Genoa.

International career
Gomes was a youth international for France, having captained the France U17s at the 2017 UEFA European Under-17 Championship, and the 2017 FIFA U-17 World Cup. He was named in the team of the tournament at the former in Croatia, in which the French reached the quarter-finals. In France's opening match at the latter tournament in India, he scored in a 7–1 win over New Caledonia. 

In August 2018, Gomes was called up for the first time to the under-19 team for friendlies against Slovenia, Croatia and India. He was selected for the 2019 UEFA European Under-19 Championship in Armenia.

Style of play
Gomes is nicknamed "N'Golo Kanté" by his teammates, who liken him to the French international midfielder for his efforts in recovering the ball.

Personal life
Gomes is the son of Bissau-Guinean footballer Amarildo Gomes, who was developing at Beauvais and Rennes before retiring through a knee injury. His brother Ylan Gomes is also a professional footballer. A 2016 profile of Gomes by Le Parisien noted his passion for history, particularly the French Revolution.

Career statistics

Honours
Manchester City
 FA Community Shield: 2018

Individual
UEFA European Under-17 Championship Team of the Tournament: 2017

References

External links
Manchester City profile

2000 births
Living people
Sportspeople from Argenteuil
Footballers from Val-d'Oise
French footballers
France youth international footballers
Association football midfielders
Évreux FC 27 players
Manchester City F.C. players
Paris Saint-Germain F.C. players
Jong PSV players
Barnsley F.C. players
Palermo F.C. players
Championnat National 2 players
Eerste Divisie players
English Football League players
Serie B players
French expatriate footballers
Expatriate footballers in England
Expatriate footballers in the Netherlands
Expatriate footballers in Italy
French expatriate sportspeople in England
French expatriate sportspeople in the Netherlands
French expatriate sportspeople in Italy
Black French sportspeople
French people of Bissau-Guinean descent